Yekaterina Atkova (born 20 April 1985) is a Russian handball player who plays for the club KSK Luch Moscow. She is also member of the Russian national team. She competed at the 2015 World Women's Handball Championship in Denmark.

References

External links

1985 births
Living people
Russian female handball players
Sportspeople from Saint Petersburg